Brabrand Idrætsforening is a Danish football club located in Brabrand in the western suburbs of Aarhus.
They currently compete in the Danish 2nd Division, the third tier of Danish football.

Players

Current squad

Joining 1 January 2017

External links
  Brabrand IF – official team site
  Brabrand IF – official club site
  Brabrand IF – official football site (amateur)
  Brabrand IF – clubfacts at the Danish Football Association's database.
  Fanclub 

Football clubs in Denmark
1934 establishments in Denmark